Last Holiday is a 1950 British film featuring Alec Guinness in his sixth starring role. The low key, dark comedy was written and co-produced by J. B. Priestley and directed by Henry Cass, featuring irony and wit often associated with Priestley. Shooting locations included Bedfordshire and Devon. The film was co-written by an uncredited J. Lee Thompson.

The film's narrative revolves around George Bird, who is a salesman for an agricultural implements company. During a routine visit to his physician, he is told that he has a terminal disease and only a short time to live. He decides to spend his final days in an expensive hotel. Once there, he acquires friends and a love interest who eventually learn of his plight.

Synopsis
George Bird (Guinness), an ordinary, unassuming salesman of agricultural implements who inexplicably speaks with a posh public school accent, visits a physician for a routine check-up and is told he has Lampington's disease, a newly identified condition which allows him only a few weeks to live. He accepts the doctor's advice to take his savings and enjoy himself in the little time left to him.

A bachelor with no family or friends, Bird decides to spend his last days at an upmarket residential hotel among its elite clientele. By chance, a salesman in a used clothing store has acquired two suitcases, covered with international labels. The cases are full of a deceased Lord's bespoke tailored wardrobe that perfectly fits Bird. Bird acquires the wardrobe and luggage and takes the salesman's advice to shave off his moustache that give him the appearance of a wealthy gentleman.

Bird's unassuming attitude generates a great deal of interest among the hotel's residents because he wears the same expensive clothes as all the other guests. He is seen as an enigma to be solved, with wild speculations offered as to his identity and possible noble lineage. The hotel's housekeeper, Mrs. Poole (Walsh), guesses the truth, and Bird confides his secret to her. Bird quickly acquires friends and influence, falls in love (possibly for the first time in his life), sets wrongs to right, and is offered lucrative business opportunities. But these successes only serve to make him reflect on the irony that he will have no time to enjoy them.

During a strike by the hotel's staff, Bird comes into contact with Sir Trevor Lampington (Thesiger), the doctor after whom Lampington's disease was named. He insists that Bird cannot possibly have the disease as he has no symptoms, and contacts the hospital to ask it to check. Just as the hospital discovers its error Bird enters and it is confirmed that he indeed was given the wrong diagnosis.

Overjoyed, he is ready to begin life afresh with his new sweetheart, friends and business opportunities.

In a twist ending, however, he is tragically killed in a car accident on the way back to the hotel. He takes a shortcut through the sleepy village of Fallow End, where a man has just set his sick old dog down on the road to have a “last sniff round” before taking him to be put to sleep. Swerving to avoid the dog, Bird runs head-on into a lorry. Meanwhile, the hotel guests, having learned the truth about Bird's identity and misdiagnosis, are irritated that he has not appeared for a dinner celebrating his good news. As the evening wears on, most of them express their doubts about him, and one of them, Bellinghurst, concludes the meal with an arrogant, longwinded “toast” to Bird, who is presumably back in his place. In hospital, resigned to his fate, Bird tells a nurse to “give his love” to all his friends at the hotel. Mrs. Poole silences Bellinghurst and shames the rest with the news that Mr. Bird is dead.

Cast

Alec Guinness as George Bird
Beatrice Campbell as Sheila Rockingham
Brian Worth as Derek Rockingham
Kay Walsh as Mrs. Poole
Wilfrid Hyde-White as Chalfont
Sid James as Joe Clarence
Jean Colin as Daisy Clarence
Helen Cherry as Miss Mellows
Muriel George as Lady Oswington
Esma Cannon as Miss Fox
Moultrie Kelsall as Sir Robert Kyle
Bernard Lee as Inspector Wilton
Coco Aslan as Gambini
Heather Wilde as Maggie the maid
Ernest Thesiger as Sir Trevor Lampington
Eric Maturin as Wrexham
Campbell Cotts as Cabinet Minister Bellinghurst
Brian Oulton as Prescott (Bellinghurst's assistant)
Mme. Kirkwood-Hackett as Miss Hatfield
Lockwood West as Dinsdale
Ronald Simpson as Dr. Pevensey
David McCallum as the Fiddler
 Meier Tzelniker as Baltin 
Jack Arrow as Lorry driver (accident)

Production
The film was produced at Welwyn Studios with location shots at Luton, Bedfordshire, shopping parade, and 'The Rosetor Hotel', (now demolished), in Torquay, Devon. Priestley has sole screenwriting credit. However, some uncredited work was done on it by J. Lee Thompson.

Reception
Upon its release in New York City in November 1950, Bosley Crowther called it an "amusing and poignant little picture" that is "simple and modest in structure but delightfully rich in character."

However, in Realism and Tinsel: Cinema and Society in Britain 1939–48, critic Robert Murphy asserted that Last Holiday was not as good as it should have been, given the excellent performances by Guinness, Walsh and James. In particular he described the film's production values as "shabby" and singled out Priestley's trick ending for even harsher criticism, calling it "disastrously inappropriate."

Other releases and versions
The film was released on VHS in 1994, and again in 2000, by Homevision. It was released in DVD format by Janus Films and The Criterion Collection under licence from Studio Canal in June 2009, but was dropped from their catalogues in 2011.

Last Holiday of 2006 was a loose remake, starring Queen Latifah as Georgia Byrd, LL Cool J, Timothy Hutton, Alicia Witt, and Gérard Depardieu.

See also
Joe Versus the Volcano, another film with a similar premise
 The Blue Castle, a novel with a similar plot

References

External links

1950 films
British black comedy films
1950s black comedy films
Ealing Studios films
Films with screenplays by J. B. Priestley
Films directed by Henry Cass
Warner Bros. films
British comedy-drama films
1950 comedy-drama films
British black-and-white films
Films with screenplays by J. Lee Thompson
Films shot in Bedfordshire
Films shot in Devon
Films shot at Welwyn Studios
Films about death
Films set in hotels
Films about road accidents and incidents
1950s English-language films
1950s British films
Films about salespeople